Jack Cleveland Montgomery (July 23, 1917 – June 11, 2002) was a United States Army officer, a citizen of the Cherokee Nation, and a recipient of the United States military's highest decoration—the Medal of Honor—for his actions in World War II.

Montgomery joined the Army in 1937 from Sallisaw, Oklahoma, and by February 22, 1944 was serving as a first lieutenant in the 180th Infantry Regiment, 45th Infantry Division. On that day, near Padiglione, Italy, Montgomery single-handedly attacked German positions, killing eleven enemy soldiers and taking dozens of prisoners. For his actions in the battle, during which he was seriously wounded, he was awarded the Medal of Honor a year later, on January 15, 1945.

Montgomery graduated from the Chilocco Indian Agricultural School in north-central Oklahoma. Coincidentally, Ernest Childers, who also earned the Medal of Honor in World War II for service in Italy, graduated from the same school. Montgomery left the Army while still a first lieutenant. He died at age 84 and was buried in Fort Gibson National Cemetery, Fort Gibson, Oklahoma. The Veterans Health Administration medical center located in Muskogee, Oklahoma, is named in his honor.

Medal of Honor citation
First Lieutenant Montgomery's official Medal of Honor citation reads:
For conspicuous gallantry and intrepidity at risk of life above and beyond the call of duty on February 22, 1944, near Padiglione, Italy. Two hours before daybreak a strong force of enemy infantry established themselves in 3 echelons at 50 yards, 100 yards, and 300 yards, respectively, in front of the rifle platoons commanded by 1st Lt. Montgomery. The closest position, consisting of 4 machineguns and 1 mortar, threatened the immediate security of the platoon position. Seizing an M1 rifle and several hand grenades, 1st Lt. Montgomery crawled up a ditch to within hand grenade range of the enemy. Then climbing boldly onto a little mound, he fired his rifle and threw his grenades so accurately that he killed 8 of the enemy and captured the remaining 4. Returning to his platoon, he called for artillery fire on a house, in and around which he suspected that the majority of the enemy had entrenched themselves. Arming himself with a carbine, he proceeded along the shallow ditch, as withering fire from the riflemen and machinegunners in the second position was concentrated on him. He attacked this position with such fury that 7 of the enemy surrendered to him, and both machineguns were silenced. Three German dead were found in the vicinity later that morning. 1st Lt. Montgomery continued boldly toward the house, 300 yards from his platoon position. It was now daylight, and the enemy observation was excellent across the flat open terrain which led to 1st Lt. Montgomery's objective. When the artillery barrage had lifted, 1st Lt. Montgomery ran fearlessly toward the strongly defended position. As the enemy started streaming out of the house, 1st Lt. Montgomery, unafraid of treacherous snipers, exposed himself daringly to assemble the surrendering enemy and send them to the rear. His fearless, aggressive, and intrepid actions that morning, accounted for a total of 11 enemy dead, 32 prisoners, and an unknown number of wounded. That night, while aiding an adjacent unit to repulse a counterattack, he was struck by mortar fragments and seriously wounded. The selflessness and courage exhibited by 1st Lt. Montgomery in alone attacking 3 strong enemy positions inspired his men to a degree beyond estimation.

See also

List of Medal of Honor recipients
List of Medal of Honor recipients for World War II

References

General

1917 births
2002 deaths
Cherokee Nation United States military personnel
People from Sequoyah County, Oklahoma
Military personnel from Oklahoma
United States Army officers
United States Army personnel of World War II
United States Army Medal of Honor recipients
Bacone College alumni
Recipients of the Silver Star
World War II recipients of the Medal of Honor
20th-century Native Americans